Hamilton Historic Civic Center is a registered historic district in Hamilton, Ohio, listed in the National Register of Historic Places on 1995-06-29.  It contains 4 contributing buildings.

Included buildings are the Anthony Wayne Hotel (now senior housing), the 1935 Hamilton Municipal Building(now The Hamilton Mill business incubator and Heritage Hall), the Soldier's, Sailor's and Pioneer's Monument, and the High-Main Bridge (now replaced).

Historic uses 
Civic
Government Office
Road-Related

Notes 

Government buildings on the National Register of Historic Places in Ohio
Historic districts in Butler County, Ohio
National Register of Historic Places in Butler County, Ohio
Buildings and structures in Hamilton, Ohio
Historic districts on the National Register of Historic Places in Ohio